Dărcăuți is a commune in Soroca District, Moldova. It is composed of three villages: Dărcăuți, Dărcăuții Noi (depopulated as of 2014) and Mălcăuți.

References

Communes of Soroca District